Return to Seoul (originial English title All The People I’ll Never Be) is a 2022 drama film directed and written by Davy Chou. A French-German-Belgian coproduction, the film revolves around Freddie (Ji-Min Park), a 25-year old French adoptee, who goes to South Korea and seeks her biological parents. The film premiered on 22 May at the 2022 Cannes Film Festival under the Un Certain Regard section. The film was selected as the Cambodian entry for the Best International Feature Film at the 95th Academy Awards, and made the December shortlist.

Plot
25-year-old Freddie, who was born in South Korea and adopted by French parents, arrives in Seoul "by accident" after her flight to Tokyo was cancelled. Freddie bonds with Tena, the desk clerk at her hotel, and sleeps with a man she meets with Tena in restaurant. Tena and a friend of hers recommend to Freddie that she contact the Hammond Adoption Center in order to find her biological parents. 

Although Freddie is initially insistent that she is not in Korea to find her parents, she goes to Hammond, who tell her that she can have Hammond send telegrams to her parents, and if her parents wish to see her, they can respond. However, if the parents ask Hammond not to contact them again, Hammond must abide by this request. Freddie asks them to send the telegram, and her father responds. Freddie travels with Tena to visit her father, with Tena serving as a translator between them. 

Freddie is initially uncomfortable, but agrees to stay three nights with her biological father’s family. At the end of the three days, Freddie leaves, and becomes frustrated with her father’s repeated calls and texts emphasizing how much he regrets giving her up for adoption. She goes to a bar with Tena and the man she slept with on her first night in Seoul, and makes Tena uncomfortable with her cruel rejection of his feelings for her. As they are leaving, she tries to kiss Tena, who rejects her, telling Freddie she is “a very sad person”.

Freddie tries to return to her hotel with the DJ from the bar, but is confronted by her drunken father, who admonishes her and asks why she isn’t returning his calls or texts. Tena also appears, but Freddie screams at them and leaves.

Two years later, Freddie is living in Seoul. She goes on a date with André, a weapons dealer, who tells Freddie that she would be good in his industry. Freddie tells him that it is her birthday, and that every year on her birthday, she wonders if her mother thought about her that day. At a birthday party thrown for her, she reveals to a co-worker who is also an adoptee that she has sent several follow up telegrams to her mother, who finally responded that she did not want to see her, meaning that Freddie will not be able to contact her again. It is revealed that Freddie’s father still emails her, but she largely ignores it. Freddie tells her co-worker to contact Hammond, but her co-worker says she has delayed in order to learn about the Korean culture and language beforehand. 

Five years later, Freddie speaks broken Korean and works with André selling missiles. On a business trip to Korea, she goes with her French boyfriend, Maxime, to meet with her father. Her father plays her a piano tune that he wrote and performed, and Freddie is surprised by how moving she finds it. She becomes annoyed at Maxime when he says to her father that it is Freddie's destiny to help defend South Korea from North Korea, and after the dinner, she breaks up with him and wakes up the next morning on the streets.

Freddie reaches out to Hammond again, and although they were not supposed to contact her mother any further, her mother responds and says she wants to meet Freddie. At a Hammond facility, they meet, and Freddie breaks down crying as her mother embraces her. Her mother gives Freddie her email address so they can stay in contact.

One year later, on Freddie’s birthday, she is backpacking, and ends up in a hotel. She writes an email to her mother apologizing for not previously emailing her, and says that she thinks she is happy. However, the email returns to her, saying that the email address her mother gave her does not exist. Freddie goes to the hotel lobby and notices a piano with sheet music. She sits down and attempts to sight read the music. Although she initially stumbles over the notes, it eventually morphs into a beautiful melody.

Cast

Production
Director Davy Chou got the idea for the film from a similar experience with his friend, also a French woman in her 20s adopted from South Korean biological parents, who traveled with him to South Korea during the filming of his 2011 film Golden Slumbers to meet her biological father and grandmother for the first time. Seeing how emotional their meeting was, he decided to make a film on similar lines. Not knowledgeable in Korean culture or the experience of adoption at first, he researched these elements by talking to his friend and other adoptees as well as reading books, identifying some similarities with his own life as the son of immigrants from Cambodia who had left the country before the Khmer Rouge took over. Chou met Ji-Min Park through a "personal introduction" and decided to cast her as Freddie, her first film role, as he saw her as someone who "shared the essence of Freddie’s free-spiritedness". He further developed her characterization through conversations with Park, which "challenged some of his notions as a male director and helped him understand how a young French woman might respond to aspects of Korea’s highly patriarchal society." Filming took place over six weeks in late 2021 in South Korea and Romania.

Release
The film was first shown at the 2022 Cannes Film Festival on 22 May with the English title All The People I’ll Never Be in the Un Certain Regard section. Shortly before it was shown, MUBI and Sony Pictures Classics acquired the distribution rights to the film in different regions, with Sony Pictures Classics changing the film's English title to Return to Seoul. The film is set for release in Korea during the first half of 2023 and will open in theaters across Europe in January and North America in February.

Reception

See also
 List of submissions to the 95th Academy Awards for Best International Feature Film
 List of Cambodian submissions for the Academy Award for Best International Feature Film

References

External links
 

2022 drama films
2022 films
Belgian drama films
German drama films
Films set in South Korea
Films shot in South Korea
Films shot in Romania
Films directed by Davy Chou
2020s French films